The Minnamurra River, an open mature wave dominated barrier estuary, is located in the Illawarra region of New South Wales, Australia.

Location and features
Minnamurra River rises within the Budderoo National Park on the eastern slopes of the Illawarra escarpment, west of the village of Jamberoo and north of Missingham Pass, and flows generally east, descending the  Minamurra Falls. The river drains into the Jamberoo Valley surrounded by Stockyard Mountain to the north, Jamberoo Mountain to the west and Noorinan and Saddleback Mountain to the south. The mouth of the river lies immediately north of the Kiama suburb of Minnamurra at Minnamurra Point. The entrance is characterised by a small island just offshore from the mouth. The river descends  over its  course.

The Princes Highway crosses the Minnamurra River north of the suburb of Minnamurra.

The name Minnamurra is derived from the Aboriginal word of Meme Mora, meaning "river of many fish".

In 1893, four adults and three children were drowned whilst rowing a small boat near the mouth of the Minnamurra River. The boat succumbed to heavy surf conditions.

See also

 
 List of rivers of New South Wales (L–Z)
 Rivers of New South Wales

References

External links
 

Rivers of New South Wales
Wollongong